This is a list of public art in Jasper, Indiana.

This list applies only to works of public art accessible in an outdoor public space. For example, this does not include artwork visible inside a museum.

References

Jasper
Buildings and structures in Dubois County, Indiana
Jasper, Indiana